Ibrahim Diaw or Ibrahima Diaw (born 28 November 1979) is a French-born Senegalese retired handballer who played for the Senegalese national team. He was former co-captain of Paris Saint-Germain Handball alongside Didier Dinart, then with Daniel Narcisse.

Achievements
LNH Division 1:
Winner: 2013 
Silver Medalist: 2005, 2014
Bronze Medalist: 2006
LNH Division 2:
Winner: 2010
Coupe de France:
Winner: 2007, 2014
Finalist: 2008, 2013
Coupe de France:
Finalist: 2005, 2006
Liga Națională:
Winner: 2016 
Bronze Medalist: 2015

References

1979 births
People from Poissy
Citizens of Senegal through descent
Senegalese male handball players
French male handball players
Living people
CS Dinamo București (men's handball) players
Senegalese expatriate sportspeople in Romania
French expatriate sportspeople in Romania
Expatriate handball players
French sportspeople of Senegalese descent
Sportspeople from Yvelines